The Heitersberg railway line (Heitersbergstrecke) is a Swiss railway line between the stations of Killwangen-Spreitenbach and Aarau on the east-west main line between Zürich and Bern. The main structure of the line is the 4,929 metre-long Heitersberg Tunnel, which has its west portal near Mellingen  and its east portal near Killwangen.
 
The line was built in the 1970s as part of the planned New Main Transversal (Neue Haupttransversale, NHT) project. It was opened on 1 June 1975 and handed over for scheduled operations on 22 May 1975.

Route
Outside of Othmarsingen, there is a three-level crossing with a cantonal road and branches running towards Hendschiken and Lenzburg. West of Lenzburg a new line runs to Rupperswil and then it turns into a recently rebuilt four-track section to Aarau.
 
Thanks to the new direct line, including the tunnel, which allows speeds of 140 km/h, the running time between Zürich and Bern has been reduced by 20 minutes, partly as a result of the building of other structures such as the Grauholz Tunnel near Bern.
 
Ballastless track was tested in the Heitersberg tunnel from 1975 to 2014.

Development projects
The construction of the Chestenberg Tunnel between Rupperswil and Gruemet was proposed, but a direct 30 km-long tunnel between Aarau and Zürich is now favoured. The Eppenberg Tunnel has been under construction since 2015 as a continuation of the Heitersberg line towards Olten.

References 

Railway lines in Switzerland
Railway lines opened in 1975
1975 establishments in Switzerland
Swiss Federal Railways lines
15 kV AC railway electrification